Kaden Hopkins (born 24 March 2000) is a Bermudan racing cyclist, who currently rides for amateur team Essax.

Career
Riding at the 2021 Junior Pan American Games Hopkins rode in both the Road race and Time trial. He finished 30th in the road race but won the silver medal coming second in the time trial only losing out on gold by 4 seconds. In December 2021 Hopkins re-signed for his amateur squad, Equipo Essax for the 2022 season.

Hopkins opened his 2022 season with a win at the Interclubs Vinalopó-Castalla, finishing 25 seconds ahead of the next rider.
The 2022 Commonwealth Games were the first races of the season where Hopkins would race against professional cyclists in the Road race he finished fourteenth 3' 54" down on the winner Aaron Gate. In the Time trial he finished just outside of the top 10, in eleventh place beating former Hour record holder Daniel Bigham by four seconds.
Hopkin's main goal for the 2022 season was the 2022 UCI Road World Championships held in Australia. During the event he rode the under-23 time trial where he eventually finished in thirteenth position 1' 33" down on the winner. When Hopkins crossed the finish line he had set the fastest time so far so he sat in the 'Hot seat' for a period of time.  On 29 September 2022 Hopkins announced he had been in talks with a number of teams for the 2023 season to further his cycling career.

Major results
Sources:

2015
 National Junior Road Championships
1st Road race
2nd Time trial
2017
 2nd Time trial, National Junior Road Championships
2018
 1st  Time trial, Caribbean Junior Road Championships
 National Junior Road Championships
2nd Road race
2nd Time trial
2019
 1st  Time trial, Caribbean Road Championships
 1st Time trial, National Under-23 Road Championships
 3rd Road race, National Road Championships
2020
 National Road Championships
1st Time trial
2nd Road race
 8th Overall Vuelta a la Independencia Nacional
1st  Young rider classification
2021
 National Road Championships
1st Time trial
3rd Road race
 2nd  Time trial, Junior Pan American Games
 8th Overall Tour des Landes
 10th Overall Vuelta a la Independencia Nacional
1st Stage 3
2022
 1st  Time trial, Caribbean Road Championships 
 1st Interclubs Vinalopó-Castalla
 9th Trofeo Olias Industrial

References

External links

2000 births
Living people
Bermudian male cyclists
People from Hamilton, Bermuda